H. Bruce "Lucky" Humberstone (November 18, 1901 – October 11, 1984) was an American film director. He was previously a movie actor (as a child), a script clerk, and an assistant director, working with directors such as King Vidor, Edmund Goulding, and Allan Dwan.

Early years
Humberstone was born in Buffalo, New York, and attended Miami Military Academy in Miami, Florida.

Film 
One of 28 founders of the Directors Guild of America, Humberstone worked on several silent movie films for 20th Century Fox. Humberstone did not specialize; he worked on comedies, dramas, and melodramas. Humberstone is best known today for the seminal film noir I Wake Up Screaming (1941) and his work on some of the Charlie Chan films. In the 1950s, Humberstone worked mostly on TV. He retired in 1966.

Recognition 
Humberstone has a star on the Hollywood Walk of Fame.

Death 
Humberstone died of pneumonia in Woodland Hills, California, on October 11, 1984, aged 82, and was buried at the Hollywood Forever Cemetery in Hollywood, California.

Partial filmography as director

 Street Scene (1931)
 The Crooked Circle (1932)
 If I Had a Million (1932) ("The Forger" segment)
 Goodbye Love (1933)
 King of the Jungle (1933)
 Merry Wives of Reno (1934)
 The Dragon Murder Case (1934)
 Three Live Ghosts (1935)
 Ladies Love Danger (1935)
 Charlie Chan at the Race Track (1936)
 Charlie Chan at the Opera (1936)
 Charlie Chan at the Olympics (1937)
 Charlie Chan in Honolulu (1938)
 Rascals (1938)
 Checkers (1938)
 Pardon Our Nerve (1939)
 Pack Up Your Troubles (1939)
 The Quarterback (1940)
 Lucky Cisco Kid (1940)
 I Wake Up Screaming (1941)
 Sun Valley Serenade (1941)
 Tall, Dark and Handsome (1941)
 Iceland (1942)
 To the Shores of Tripoli (1942)
 Hello, Frisco, Hello (1943)
 Pin Up Girl (1944)
 Wonder Man (1945)
 Three Little Girls in Blue (1946)
 The Homestretch (1947)
 Fury at Furnace Creek (1948)
 South Sea Sinner (1950)
 Happy Go Lovely (1952) British
 She's Working Her Way Through College (1953)
 The Desert Song (1953)
 Ten Wanted Men (1955)
 The Purple Mask (1955)
 Tarzan and the Lost Safari (1957)
 Tarzan's Fight for Life (1958)
 Tarzan and the Trappers (1958)
 Madison Avenue (1961)

References

External links

 

1901 births
1984 deaths
Male actors from Buffalo, New York
American male film actors
American male silent film actors
American film directors
American television directors
20th-century American male actors
Burials at Hollywood Forever Cemetery